Mira Zimińska (1901–1997) was a Polish stage and film actress. She was the founder and long-time director of the Mazowsze folk group.

In 1954 she married Tadeusz Sygietyński. After his death in 1955 she became a director of Mazowsze.

Filmography
 1922 – Wszystko się kręci
 1924 – The Unspeakable
 1925 – Iwonka
 1926 – The Unthinkable
 1930 – Exile to Siberia
 1930 – Paramount on Parade (Polish version only)
 1933 – Każdemu wolno kochać
 1935 – Manewry miłosne
 1936 – Papa się żeni
 1936 – Ada! To nie wypada!
 1951 – Warsaw Premiere (story idea)

References

External links

Mira Zimińska at the www.mazowsze.waw.pl 

1901 births
1997 deaths
Actors from Płock
People from Płock Governorate
Polish cabaret performers
Polish film actresses
Polish silent film actresses
Polish stage actresses
Polish theatre directors
20th-century Polish actresses
Grand Crosses of the Order of Polonia Restituta
Burials at Powązki Military Cemetery
20th-century Polish women singers
20th-century comedians
Recipients of the State Award Badge (Poland)
Recipients of the Order of the White Eagle (Poland)
Recipient of the Meritorious Activist of Culture badge